In music, Op. 106 stands for Opus number 106. Compositions that are assigned this number include:

 Beethoven – Piano Sonata No. 29
 Dvořák – String Quartet No. 13
 Fauré – Le jardin clos
 Reger – Der 100. Psalm
 Schubert – An Sylvia
 Schumann – Declamation with piano, "Schön Hedwig"